Joseph, Baron Ducreux (26 June 1735 – 24 July 1802) was a French noble, portrait painter, pastelist, miniaturist, and engraver, who was a successful portraitist at the court of Louis XVI of France, and resumed his career at the conclusion of the French Revolution. He was made a baron and premier peintre de la reine (First Painter to the Queen), and drew the last portrait ever made of Louis XVI before the king's execution. His less formal portraits reflect his fascination with physiognomy and show an interest in expanding the range of facial expressions beyond those of conventional portraiture.

Life and career

Born in Nancy, Ducreux may have trained with his father, who was also a painter. When Ducreux went to Paris in 1760, he trained as the only student of the pastelist Maurice Quentin de La Tour, who specialized in portraiture. Jean-Baptiste Greuze was an important influence on Ducreux's oil technique.

In 1769, Ducreux was sent to Vienna in order to paint a miniature of Marie Antoinette (shown left) before she left the city in 1770 and married Louis XVI of France. Ducreux was made a baron and premier peintre de la reine (First Painter to the Queen) in rewards for his services. Ducreux was given this appointment by Marie-Antoinette even though he was not a member of the Royal Academy of Painting and Sculpture, which had been founded in 1648. The academy was strictly hierarchical and the posts of first painter, ordinary painter and inspector or inspector general of royal factories were customarily reserved for members of the academy.

At the outbreak of the French Revolution, Ducreux traveled to London. There he drew the last portrait ever made of Louis XVI before the king's execution.

Jacques-Louis David became one of Ducreux's associates when the latter returned to Paris in 1793. David helped Ducreux continue an official career. Ducreux's residence became an informal salon for artists and musicians, who commissioned portraits from him. One of these musicians was his friend Étienne Méhul, who is said to have based the main character of one of his operas on Ducreux.

Ducreux had several children. His eldest son Jules was a painter and infantry captain who died in the Battle of Jemappes; several of his paintings still exist. His other sons died young. His eldest daughter, Rose-Adélaïde Ducreux, also became a painter, as it is said did his daughter Antoinette-Clémence.

Work

Ducreux specialized in portrait painting. He completed his early portraits in pastel, including those of connoisseurs Pierre-Jean Mariette, the Comte de Caylus and Ange-Laurent de la Live de July. These works may have been copies after De La Tour. Although Ducreux cataloged his works in list form from 1760 onward, he rarely signed his paintings. Thus, many of his works remain erroneously attributed to other artists.

Other portraits by Ducreux include those of Pierre Choderlos de Laclos and Maria Theresa of Austria, as well as those mentioned above of Louis XVI and Marie Antoinette. Ducreux also made several well-known self-portraits in the 1780s and 1790s, including one in 1783 in which he painted himself in the middle of a large yawn (the Getty Center, Los Angeles).  In another, Portrait de l'artiste sous les traits d'un moqueur (c. 1793, Louvre), the artist guffaws and points at the viewer.

With these self-portraits  Ducreux attempted to break free from the constraints of traditional portraiture. His interest in physiognomy—the belief that a person's outer appearance, especially the shape and lines of their face, could reveal their inner character—influenced him in creating his warm and individualistic works. For example, his portrait Le Discret (c. 1790) depicts a man with a timorous facial expression requesting silence by pressing his finger against his mouth, gesturing by which he appears to be demanding discretion or prudence.

Through unusual body language and physical appearances, these portraits parallel the vivacious tronies of Dutch Golden Age painting and the "character heads" of contemporary Austrian sculptor Franz Xaver Messerschmidt (1736–1783), some of whose busts were self-portraits with extreme expressions.

Internet meme
A reproduction of Ducreux's self-portrait Portrait de l'artiste sous les traits d'un moqueur became subject to internet popularity as part of an internet meme in the late 2000s and early 2010s. In the meme, rap and pop song lyrics, common internet phrases, and similar tropes are paraphrased in verbose, stilted, or faux-archaic English and overlaid on top of the portrait to create an image macro.

Gallery

References

Further reading
 Georgette Lyon, "Joseph Ducreux. Premier peintre de Marie Antoinette," Paris, 1958 
 Emilie-Juliette Gauby, "Joseph Ducreux 1735–1802 Peintre de portraits", Student at Blaise Pascal University Clermont II, 2004]

External links

 Getty Museum: Self-portrait information
 Getty Museum: Biography
 Enlightenment: Royal Academy of Painting 

1735 births
1802 deaths
Barons of France
18th-century French painters
French male painters
Internet memes
Artists from Nancy, France
French portrait painters
French Realist painters
18th-century French male artists